The 2020 Missouri State Bears football team represented Missouri State University in the 2020–21 NCAA Division I FCS football season. They were led by Bobby Petrino in his first season as the program's 21st head coach. The Bears play their home games at Robert W. Plaster Stadium. They competed as a member of the Missouri Valley Football Conference. The Bears won their 10th conference championship (shared with South Dakota State) and returned the playoffs for the first time since 1990. They lost in the first round at North Dakota 44–10. Bobby Petrino won the conference coach of the year award in his first season. They finished the season ranked 13th in both Coaches and STATS poll.

Previous season

The Bears finished the 2019 season 1–10, 1–7 in MVFC play to finish in a two-way tie for ninth place. On January 10, 2020, head coach Dave Steckel was bought out of his contract with Missouri State after compiling a 13–42 record over five seasons. Five days later, on January 15, Bobby Petrino was announced as the team's new head coach.

Offseason

Transfers

Incoming

Note: • Transferred in Spring, immediately eligible for Spring season.

Outgoing

Preseason 
Even with Bobby Petrino as head coach; expectations were low heading into the 2020 season. The Bears were coming off a 1–10 record in 2019. As a result of the COVID-19 pandemic; the Missouri Valley Football Conference season was moved from the Fall to the Spring. Missouri State originally had non-conference games scheduled against Oklahoma, Tarleton State, and Montana. The games against Montana and Tarleton State were canceled. The Bears added a home and home series with Central Arkansas in the Fall. The game at Oklahoma was kept on the schedule as planned.

MVFC Media Poll
The Media picked the Bears to finish in a tie for 9th place with Western Illinois. This was the second straight season Missouri State was predicted to finish last in the conference.

Preseason Awards
Missouri State had two players selected to the 2020 All-MVFC Preseason Team. Junior wide receiver Damoriea Vick and Senior cornerback Zack Sanders were the players chosen, both as honorable mentions.

Personnel

Coaching Staff
The coaching staff for the Bears was completed overhauled following the hire of Bobby Petrino. Director of Football Operations Lynn Mentzer was the only person retained from the Dave Steckel era. Former Central Michigan special teams and safeties coach Ryan Beard, joined the Bears as the defensive coordinator. Nick Petrino joined the Bears as the offensive coordinator/ quarterbacks coach after spending the previous season at UT Martin in the same capacity.

Roster
{| class="toccolours" style="text-align: left;"
|-
| colspan=11 style="color:#FFFFFF;background:#5E0009; text-align: center;border:2px solid #000000"| 2020 Missouri State Bears Football Roster
|-
|valign="top"|

Quarterback
 1 Matt Struck – Senior (6'4, 220)
 7 Darrias Pearsall – Freshman (6'2, 205)
 8 Jaden Johnson –  Freshman (6'2, 216)
10 Jake Van Dyne – Freshman (6'3, 193)
17 Reece Dawson – Freshman (6'4, 218)

Running Back
 5 Jeremiah Wilson –  Sophomore (6'1, 216)
13 Tobias Little – Senior (6'0, 237)
14 Myron Mason – Junior (5'8, 200)
20 Kellen Porter – Freshman (5'10, 211)
21 Myles Shaw – Freshman (5'9, 180)
25 D.J. Frost – Sophomore (6'1, 202)
27 Tra'Keci Cooper – Freshman (5'11, 185) 
28 Kevon Latulas – Junior (6'0, 200)
31 Celdon Manning – Freshman (5'10, 180)
32 Brandon Benjamin - Freshman (5'9, 200)

Wide Receiver
 4 Lorenzo Thomas – Senior (6'5 200)
 6 Cairo Payne – Freshman (5'11, 178)
16 Damoriea Vick – Junior (6'3, 213)
18 Ethan Swanegan – Sophomore (6'5, 213)
24 Payton Lusk – Freshman (6'3, 182)
80 Isaiah Allred – Junior (6'3, 214)
81 Jakael Jackson – Freshman (6'1, 175)
83 Jaron Burks – Sophomore (6'3, 192) 
84 DVontae Key – Freshman (5'10, 175)
88 Hunter Wood – Freshman (6'1, 205)

Tight End
 2 Ron Tiavaasue – Junior (6'3, 250)
 9 Jordan Murray – Junior (6'4, 233)
11 Armand Baker – Junior (6'4, 247)
49 Carson Buddemeyer –  Freshman (6'2, 246)
86 Sloan Hayden – Freshman (6'5, 240)
89 Isaac Smith – ''Senior (6'7, 250)Punter31 Grant Burkett –  Freshman (6'1, 181)

|width="25"| 
|valign="top"|Offensive Lineman50 Paul Sogialofa – Junior (6'5, 325)
55 Andrew Colvin – Senior (6'3, 310)
56 Ryan Suliafu – Sophomore (6'2, 340)
60 Sean Fitzgerald – Senior (6'2, 295)
62 Ethan Barnett –  Freshman (6'7, 301)
63 Jake Seidel – Freshman (6'5, 296)
64 Nick Gallo – Freshman (6'5, 295)
65 Ian Fitzgerald – Sophomore (6'5, 284)
66 Grant Goodson - Freshman (6'6, 290)
67 Remy Bilodeau – Sophomore (6'3, 285)
68 Baylor Christy –  Freshman (6'7, 305)
69 Nick Nielsen –  Freshman (6'5, 300)
71 Arin Reynolds – Senior (6'4, 315)
72 Mark Hutchinson – Freshman (6'2, 300)
73 Landon Bebee – Sophomore (6'3, 291)
74 Mike Fangman – Freshman (6'2, 295)
76 Jake Swope –  Freshman (6'7, 290)
77 Kobe Brandt – Sophomore (6'6, 315)
79 Daniel Allen – Senior (6'5, 300)Defensive Lineman 2 Isaiah Sayles – DE – Junior (6'3, 238)
15 Kevin Ellis – DE – Junior (6'4, 241)
33 Anthony Payne – DE – Junior (6'2, 274) 
47 Devin Goree – DE – Freshman (6'3, 251)
90 Jimmy Williams – DE – Sophomore (6'2, 272)
91 Ja'Veo Toliver – DE – Freshman (6'5, 245)
92 Godey Coleus – DL – Senior (6'2, 283)
93 Eric Johnson – DL – Senior (6'5, 286)
94 I.K. Ahumibe – DT – Junior (6'0, 295)
95 Jalen Williams – DE –  Freshman (6'4, 240) 
96 Armon Wallace – DL – Freshman (6'0, 289)
97 Michael Pope – DE –  Freshman (6'3, 250) 
98 Arian Bhat – DL – Sophomore (6'2, 285) 
99 Charles Johnson – DL – Junior (6'2, 330)Long Snapper61 Caden Bolz –  Freshman (6'0, 240)

|width="25"| 
|valign="top"|Linebacker 
 5 Ferrin Manuleleua – Junior (6'1, 225)
 7 Titus Wall – Senior (6'0, 203)
 9 Mikey Miles – Freshman (6'2, 218)
10 Tylar Wiltz – Junior (6'1, 230)
44 Keshun Parker – Sophomore (5'11, 235) 
46 Ethan Mackowski –  Freshman (6'3, 225)
48 Tyler Lovelace – Senior (6'2, 213)
52 Bryan Ulrich – Freshman (6'0, 231)
54 Von Young –  Freshman (6'0, 226)
57 C.J. Garnett – Freshman (6'0, 217)
58 Logan Decker – Sophomore (6'1, 225)
59 Lucas Eastman –  Freshman (6'3, 230)Cornerback 0 Kaunor Ashley – Freshman (5'10, 186)
 1 Zack Sanders – Senior (6'0, 190)
 4 Montrae Braswell – Sophomore (6'0, 185)
 8 Jeremy Webb – Senior (6'4, 205)
17 Nick Hessefort – Sophomore (6'2, 200) 
22 Chanlor Johnson – Freshman (6'2, 207)
26 Tahj Chambers – Freshman (6'2, 200)
34 Kelvyn Mason –  Freshman (6'0 , 184)
36 Marquis Yarbrough – Junior (5'11, 180)Defensive Back 6 Kyriq McDonald – Sophomore (6'0, 202)
41 Cole Bowen – Freshman (5'10, 160)Safety19 Greg Washington –  Freshman (6'0, 190)
23 Breon Dixon – Junior (6'0, 212) 
29 Dwight Jacobs Jr. – Freshman (5'10, 194)
26 P.J. Hall – Freshman (6'3, 184)
39 Brock Carter – Sophomore (5'11 , 192)Placekicker37 Spencer Grosz –  Freshman (5'11, 165)
38 Jose Pizano – Sophomore (5'7, 221)
42 Logan Brock –  Freshman (6'1, 210)

|-
|}

Schedule
Missouri State had a game scheduled against Tarleton State, and Montana which were later canceled due to the COVID-19 pandemic. The Bears played three games in the Fall. One at Oklahoma to open the season and then a home and home series with Central Arkansas. The home game vs. Central Arkansas was Missouri State's Homecoming game. The Bears played a conference only schedule in the Spring. The opener against Illinois State was postponed to April 17 after winter storms made the playing surface unplayable after it was covered in snow and ice. They had two games canceled in the Spring. Illinois State opted out of the season after playing four games. The game vs. North Dakota was canceled following a positive test in the Fighting Hawks program.

Game Summaries

Fall
at #5 (FBS) Oklahoma
 
It was all Oklahoma in this one. The Bears were no match for the Sooners for the head coaching debut for Bobby Petrino. Oklahoma used a huge 31–0 first quarter to pull away comfortably. The Bears never really threatened and were shutout in the season opener. RS Freshman QB Jaden Johnson went 9–19 with 72 yards and an interception. WR Lorenzo Thomas had 46 yards on four catches as the leading receiver. RB Tarrell Roberts led Missouri State on the ground with one carry for 26 yards which was nearly half of the 54 rushing yards the Bears tallied up. Meanwhile; for the Sooners Spencer Rattler had four passing TD's in the first half and threw for nearly 300 yards. RB Seth McGowan had 61 yards on nine carries and found the end zone once on a 37 yard pass from Spencer Rattler. WR Theo Howard had 63 yards on five catches.

at #11 Central Arkansas

Missouri State was on the road for the second straight week; this time in Conway, Arkansas taking on the #11 Central Arkansas Bears. The game started slow with neither team scoring in the first quarter. Both teams exchanged turnovers early in the first quarter and Hayden Ray missed a chip shot field goal. The Second quarter was another story as the teams combined for 24 points with the Bears leading 17–7 at half. Kevon Latulas returned a blocked punt for touchdown to give the Bears a 10-0 lead. Kierre Crossley scored from 4 yards out after a Jaden Johnson fumble set the UCA offense up at the MSU 17 yard line. Missouri State opened the second half scoring with a Jose Pizano 31 yard field goal to extend the lead to 20–7 with 8:47 left in the quarter. UCA would strike on a Breylin Smith seven-yard pass to Tyler Hudson; the extra point was missed and MSU led by 7. Central Arkansas grabbed the momentum and control of the game in the early stages of the 4th quarter. QB Jaden Johnson fumbled on the first play of the quarter which was returned by Dre Matthews for a touchdown. The extra point was converted and the game was tied at 20-20. Missouri State had to punt on the next drive after three straight incomplete passes. Grant Burkett booted it 43 yards and was returned 57 yards by Tyler Hudson for Central Arkansas's first lead of the game. Missouri State was never able to score the rest of the quarter and were stopped on 4th down twice in last three minutes of the game. Bobby Petrino would have to wait another week for his first victory.

#11 Central Arkansas

The Bears and Bears met for the second time in the Fall for Missouri State's Homecoming game. This would also be the last game that Missouri State played in the Fall and their last non-conference game. Like the first game, it was a low scoring contest through the first quarter. UCA struck first on a 47-yard field goal from Hayden Ray. This came on the heels of interception from MSU QB Jaden Johnson. Missouri State started the second half strong; scoring 14 straight points on rushing touchdowns by Kevon Latulas for 63 yards and Keshun Parker for one yard. UCA would answer with 14 straight points of their own. Deandre Lamont scored on a 36 yard pick six, and Mitch Perkinson scored on a 10 yard receiving touchdown. Missouri State added 10 more points before the half. Jeremiah Wilson was the third MSU running back to hit paydirt when he scored from nine yards out. Jose Pizano kicked a 30-yard field goal as time expired to put Missouri State up 24–17 at the half. UCA scored 16 unanswered points in the third quarter on three field goals from Hayden Ray and Breylin Smith's second touchdown pass of the game. Backup QB Jake Van Dyne threw two interceptions to stunt the offense for MSU. Missouri State would finish the fall winless at 0–3. Missouri State continued to turn the ball over with two fumbles lost and 4 interceptions.

Spring
at Western Illinois

The Bears traveled to Hanson Field in Macomb, Illinois for their first game of the Spring and first MVFC matchup. Missouri State jumped out to a 14-point lead in the first quarter from a five-yard rushing touchdown from Celdon Manning and 11-yard run from Jeremiah Wilson. This was the first time all season that the Bears scored in the first quarter. They had been shutout in their previous three games. The Leathernecks dominated the second quarter; scoring 17 points to take a 17–14 lead into the half. Western Illinois took advantage of three turnovers by the Bears. Dennis Houston scored on six-yard pass from Connor Sampson after Jaden Johnson his first interception of the game. Greg Benton Jr. returned a Jaden Johnson fumble 75 yards to tie the game at 14. Another Bears drive stalled in Leatherneck territory when Jaden Johnson threw his second interception. WIU would use the possession to go up by three points as time expired when Mason Laramie connected from 45 yards out. The Bears returned the favor in the third with a 37 yard field goal from Jose Pizano. Pizano would another field goal in the 4th to give the Bears their first lead of the game since 6:50 in the second quarter. The Leathernecks retook the lead for the last when Tony Tate scored on the ground from two yards out. Jaden Johnson threw his first touchdown pass as a Bear when he connected with Isaac Smith for a 22-yard score. Jose Pizano kicked his third field goal of the game to put the Bears up 30–24 when he converted from 33 yards. Missouri State held on for the first win of the Bobby Petrino era.

#6 North Dakota State

The Bears returned home following the win at Western Illinois for a matchup with the #6 North Dakota State Bison. The Bears couldn't get anything going offensively and were unable to crack the Bison Defense. 25 first half points were enough for NDSU to win the game. Bison QB Zeb Noland Threw a seven-yard touchdown pass to Noah Grindorff to put the Bison up seven points. The Bears defense allowed two big plays to hand North Dakota State control. Jalen Bussey scored on a 53-yard touchdown run while Zeb Noland threw his second touchdown pass of the game when he connected with Braylon Henderson for an 81-yard score with less than 10 seconds left in the half. Jake Reinholz added a 38-yard field goal in between the long Bison scores. Jose Pizano had a 42-yard field goal blocked in the second quarter. The Bears would drop to 1–4 on the season and extend their losing streak to the Bison to 10 years.

at #21 South Dakota 

Missouri State traveled North to the Dakota Dome to visit the #21 South Dakota Coyotes. The Coyotes struck first in the 1st Quarter when Kai Henry scored on the ground from eight yards away. The Bears answered immediately when Montrae Braswell returned the ensuing kickoff 100 yards for a touchdown. The first kick return for a touchdown in two years for the Bears. South Dakota scored again on the ground when Travis Theis scored on a 31-yard run. Missouri State fought back in the second quarter with Jose Pizano kicking a 21-yard field goal. Montrae Braswell added his second touchdown of the game when he picked off South Dakota QB Carson Camp and broke numerous tackles en-route to a 36-yard pick six. The Coyotes tied the game up at 27 when Mason Lorber knocked through a 21-yard field goal. It stayed tied through the half and most of the 3rd till South Dakota added seven more on a Carson Camp 36-yard touchdown pass to Carter Bell. The Bears would tie the game up on their next drive. Jeremiah Wilson capped off an 11 play, 75 yard drive when he scored on a six-yard run. The Bears special teams came up big in the 4th quarter. Eric Johnson blocked a 44-yard field goal attempt by Mason Lorber to preserve the tie. On the next drive; Jose Pizano put the Bears up for good 27-24 after he converted a 28 yard field goal. The Bears defense sacked Carson Camp six times in the game. Bobby Petrino got his first win vs. a ranked opponent, and the Bears won their first game in the Dakota Dome after losing their previous three games there.

at #10 Northern Iowa 
 

#10 Southern Illinois

Youngstown State

FCS Playoffs

at #7 North Dakota

Awards and honors
Regular season
Missouri Valley Football Conference

STATS

Postseason

MFVC

Rankings 

Statistics

ScoringScores by quarter (non-conference opponents)Scores by quarter (MFVC opponents)Scores by quarter (All opponents)'''

References

Missouri State
Missouri State Bears football seasons
Missouri Valley Football Conference champion seasons
Missouri State
Missouri State Bears football